The red-backed thrush or rusty-backed thrush (Geokichla erythronota) is a species of bird in the family Turdidae. Traditionally, it included the red-and-black thrush (Z. mendeni) as a subspecies. It is endemic to forests on Sulawesi and the nearby islands of Buton and Kabaena in Indonesia. It is becoming rare due to habitat destruction.

Taxonomy
Geokichla erythronota is very similar in morphology to the chestnut-backed thrush (Geokichla dohertyi) and some authorities believe they are conspecific. Others believe they are distinct. A subspecies (G. e. kabaena) has been named from Kabaena and some researchers believe there is an unnamed race of G. erythronota on the island of Buton, the status of which needs to be evaluated.

Description

References

Birds described in 1859
Taxa named by Philip Sclater
Geokichla
Endemic birds of Sulawesi
Taxonomy articles created by Polbot